Charlotte Jones is a British actress, screenwriter and playwright.

Career
Her first play Airswimming debuted in 1997 at the Battersea Arts Centre in London. Her other plays include In Flame, The Dark, The Lightning Play, and Humble Boy. Charlotte Jones wrote the book to the 2004-2006 West End musical, The Woman in White, in collaboration with the David Zippel and Andrew Lloyd Webber. She has created the ITV period drama The Halcyon. It is set in 1940 and focuses on a five-star hotel at the centre of London Society and a world at war. The series was first announced on 3 December 2015, before the official cast was announced on 4 April 2016, with Steven Mackintosh and Olivia Williams playing major roles. The series was cancelled after one series.

Awards
She won the 2001 Susan Smith Blackburn Prize.

References

External links

Radio Plays by Charlotte Jones 

Living people
1968 births
Place of birth missing (living people)
Alumni of Balliol College, Oxford
British television writers
British women dramatists and playwrights
Critics' Circle Theatre Award winners
English dramatists and playwrights
English television writers
English screenwriters
British women television writers